Otites ornata is a species of picture-winged fly in the genus Otites of the family Ulidiidae.

References

ornata
Insects described in 1826
Diptera of Europe